Daireaux is a town in Buenos Aires Province, Argentina. It is the administrative seat of Daireaux Partido.

External links

 Daireaux website
 Deropedia, the free encyclopedia of Daireaux

Populated places in Buenos Aires Province
Populated places established in 1910
Daireaux Partido